Tomczyce may refer to the following places:
Tomczyce, Łódź Voivodeship (central Poland)
Tomczyce, Gmina Błędów in Masovian Voivodeship (east-central Poland)
Tomczyce, Gmina Mogielnica in Masovian Voivodeship (east-central Poland)
Tomczyce, Greater Poland Voivodeship (west-central Poland)